Mercatale in Val di Pesa is an Italian village situated in the municipality of San Casciano in Val di Pesa.

Some of the most interesting places for visiting Mercatale are: Fattoria Ispoli, Villa Licia, Piazza Vittorio Veneto, Il Vinile and the Coop Supermarket with the underground wine cellar.

Cities and towns in Tuscany
Frazioni of San Casciano in Val di Pesa